Robert DeLafayette Jeter, Jr. (May 9, 1937 – November 20, 2008) was an American football cornerback in the National Football League for the Green Bay Packers and the Chicago Bears.

Early years
Jeter was raised in Weirton, West Virginia, where he attended the segregated local school, Dunbar High School, until after his junior year in 1954. He then attended Weir High School and was a football standout his senior year in the fall of 1955.

He played college football at the University of Iowa. As a halfback with the Hawkeyes, Jeter rushed for a Rose Bowl record 194 yards on just nine carries against  California as a junior in the 1959 Rose Bowl. This total included an 81-yard touchdown run in the third quarter, another record. As a result of this performance, he was the named the game's MVP, and Iowa finished as runner-up in the AP poll. He was inducted into the Rose Bowl Hall of Fame in 1994.

Professional career
Selected by the Packers in the second round of the 1960 NFL draft, Jeter began his pro career in the Canadian Football League with the British Columbia Lions. He was used in Canada as a running back in 1960 and 1961, backing up CFL legend and former Iowa teammate Willie Fleming. Still under contract in Canada, Jeter spent the 1962 season on the Packers' taxi squad, saw limited action as a wide receiver in 1963 and 1964, and was moved to defensive back in 1965.

Jeter was part of the Packer teams that won an unprecedented three consecutive NFL championship games and the first two Super Bowls. Herb Adderley and Jeter formed one of the greatest cornerback duos in football history. Prior to the 1971 training camp under new head coach Dan Devine, Jeter was traded to the Chicago Bears, where he finished his career in 1973.

In eleven NFL seasons, Jeter had 26 interceptions for 333 yards and two touchdowns.  He also had two receptions for 25 yards. He was inducted into the Packer Hall of Fame in 1985.

After football
Jeter had worked in Chicago for the Chicago Park District alongside former Big Ten (Illinois) grappler Patrick Heffernan, coordinating citywide sporting events for kids. He also was a warehouse planner for a food company.

His son, Rob Jeter, was the head coach of the men's basketball team at the University of Wisconsin–Milwaukee. His brother, Tony Jeter, played at Nebraska and two seasons at tight end with the Pittsburgh Steelers.

Jeter died at age 71 in 2008 in Chicago of a heart attack.

References

External links

 

1937 births
2008 deaths
People from Union, South Carolina
People from Weirton, West Virginia
Players of American football from West Virginia
American football cornerbacks
Iowa Hawkeyes football players
Green Bay Packers players
Chicago Bears players
Western Conference Pro Bowl players
American players of Canadian football
Canadian football running backs
BC Lions players